Muradyan is a surname originating in Armenia. It may also refer to:

 Badal Muradyan (1915–1991), Prime Minister of Armenian SSR (1966–1972)
 Igor Muradyan (1957–2018), Armenian political activist
 Karen Muradyan (born 1992), Armenian footballer
 Nina Muradyan (born 1954), Soviet volleyball player
 Rudolf Muradyan (born 1936), Soviet and Armenian theoretical physicist

Armenian-language surnames